Brozel is a contract bridge bidding convention used to intervene after an opposing one notrump (1NT) opening bid.  It features the following calls:
Double – shows any single suit; advancer bids 2, after which intervenor corrects to his actual suit (or passes with clubs).  This was originally played as requiring either a solid suit or a very good suit and an entry, leaving advancer the opportunity to pass with a couple of side-suit stoppers, though many partnerships now allow a weaker suit.
2 – shows clubs and hearts
2 – shows diamonds and hearts
2 – shows hearts and spades
2 – shows spades and an unspecified minor suit
2NT – shows clubs and diamonds

Brozel is named loosely after its creator, Bernard Zeller.

See also
List of defenses to 1NT

References

Bridge conventions